Padikkadavan is a 2009 Indian Tamil-language masala film written and directed by Suraj. It stars Dhanush, Tamannaah, Vivek, Atul Kulkarni, Suman, Sayaji Shinde, and Pratap Pothan amongst a huge supporting cast in small pivotal and cameo roles. The music was composed by Mani Sharma with cinematography by A. Venkatesh and editing by Manoj. The film released on 14 January 2009 during Pongal and received a huge positive response. The film was successful grossing 15 crore in Tamil Nadu and established Dhanush as one of top 5 saleable heroes of Tamil cinema after then. Filming began in March 2008 and was released in Pongal 2009.

Plot

Radhakrishnan a.k.a. Rocky (Dhanush) is a 24 years old 10th grade dropout youth, who is looked down upon by his father Ramakrishnan (Pratap Pothan) because of his sharp contrast to the rest of the family, who are well-qualified in education. Rocky spends most of his time in a mechanic shop with his friends. Rocky's friends advise him to love and marry a well-educated girl so his name will be added with her name after marriage (i.e. indirectly he gets a degree after his name). He looks around by hovering around women's colleges to find a perfect girl for his mission. He succeeds in his attempt and makes Gayathri (Tamannaah), a well-educated rich girl, fall in love with him. He starts to love her and takes her to a shopping mall where she is confronted by a group of rogues who work for Rami Reddy (Sayaji Shinde), a rival of her father Samarasimha Reddy (Suman), a notorious don in Andhra Pradesh who protects his daughter by destroying the gang and taking her back to Andhra from Tamil Nadu. Rocky goes to thug-for-hire Assault Arumugam (Vivek) to help him marry Gayathri. Rocky saves Gayathri from Rami and follows her home, where he realizes that another Thirunelveli rowdy named Kasi Anandan (Atul Kulkarni), whose brother (Sashikumar Subramani) he accidentally kills, has put a price on his head. Kasi declares that if Rocky wins him in hand-to-hand combat, he will never be disturbed by him. Rocky accepts his deal and smashes him down. The movie ends as Rocky walks out while his gang applauds for him.

Cast

Music

The soundtrack consists of five songs composed by Mani Sharma.  Four of them were reused from Telugu movies composed by Sharma.

Reception

Critical response

Indiaglitz wrote, "Padikathavan is worth a watch for its unadulterated masala". Behindwoods wrote, "On the whole, Padikathavan struggles to identify itself between comedy and violence and ends up not being both".

References

External links
 

2009 films
2009 action comedy films
2000s Tamil-language films
Films scored by Mani Sharma
Indian action comedy films